Choi Kwon-soo (born October 5, 2004) is a South Korean actor. He began his career as a child actor.

Filmography

Films

Television series

Awards and nominations

References

External links 
 
 
 

2004 births
Living people
Male actors from Busan
South Korean male child actors
South Korean male television actors
South Korean male film actors